The National Book Award for Young People's Literature is one of five annual National Book Awards, which are given by the National Book Foundation (NBF) to recognize outstanding literary work by US citizens. They are awards "by writers to writers".
The panelists are five "writers who are known to be doing great work in their genre or field".

The category Young People's Literature was established in 1996. From 1969 to 1983, prior to the Foundation, there were some "Children's" categories.

The award recognizes one book written by a US citizen and published in the US from December 1 to November 30. The National Book Foundation accepts nominations from publishers until June 15, requires mailing nominated books to the panelists by August 1, and announces five finalists in October. The winner is announced on the day of the final ceremony in November. The award is $10,000 and a bronze sculpture; other finalists get $1000, a medal, and a citation written by the panel.

There were 230 books nominated for the 2010 award.

Finalists

Children's Books, 1969 to 1979

Books for "children" were first recognized by the National Book Awards in 1969 (publication year 1968). Through 1979, a single award category existed, called either "Children's Literature" or "Children's Books."

Children's Books, 1980-1983 
In 1980 under the new name The American Book Awards (TABA), the number of literary award categories jumped to 28, including two for Children's Books: hardcover and paperback. In the following three years there were three, five, and five Children's Book award categories—thus fifteen in four years—before the program was revamped with only three annual awards and none for children's books.

Young People's Literature, 1996 to date 
From 1984 to 1995, the National Book Foundation did not present awards for young people's literature.
{| class="wikitable sortable mw-collapsible"
|+Young People's Literature, 1996 to date
!Year
!Author
!Title
!Result
!Ref.
|-
| rowspan="5" |1996
|
|Parrot in the Oven, Mi Vida
|Winner
| rowspan="5" |
|-
|
|A Girl Named Disaster
| rowspan="4" |Finalist
|-
|
|Send Me Down a Miracle
|-
|
|The Long Season of Rain
|-
|
|What Jamie Saw
|-
| rowspan="5" |1997
|
|Dancing on the Edge
|Winner
| rowspan="5" |
|-
|
|Mean Margaret
| rowspan="4" |Finalist
|-
|
|Sons of Liberty
|-
|
|The Facts Speak for Themselves
|-
|
|Where You Belong
|-
| rowspan="5" |1998
|
|Holes
|Winner
| rowspan="5" |
|-
|
|A Long Way from Chicago
| rowspan="4" |Finalist
|-
|
|Joey Pigza Swallowed the Key
|-
|
|No Pretty Pictures
|-
|
|The Secret Life of Amanda K. Woods
|-
| rowspan="5" |1999
|
|When Zachary Beaver Came to Town
|Winner
| rowspan="5" |
|-
|
|Monster
| rowspan="4" |Finalist
|-
|
|Speak
|-
|
|The Birchbark House
|-
|
|The Trolls
|-
| rowspan="5" |2000
|
|Homeless Bird
|Winner
| rowspan="5" |
|-
|
|Forgotten Fire
| rowspan="4" |Finalist
|-
|
|Hurry Freedom: African Americans in Gold Rush California
|-
|
|Many Stones
|-
|
|The Book of the Lion
|-
| rowspan="5" |2001
|
|True Believer
|Winner
| rowspan="5" |
|-
|
|Carver: A Life in Poems
| rowspan="4" |Finalist
|-
|
|A Step From Heaven
|-
|
|The Tiger Rising
|-
|
|We Were There Too! Young People in U.S. History
|-
| rowspan="5" |2002
|
|The House of the Scorpion
|Winner
| rowspan="5" |
|-
|
|19 Varieties of Gazelle: Poems of the Middle East
| rowspan="4" |Finalist
|-
|
|Feed
|-
|
|Hush
|-
|
|This Land Was Made for You and Me: The Life and Songs of Woody Guthrie
|-
| rowspan="5" |2003
|
|The Canning Season
|Winner
| rowspan="5" |
|-
|
|An American Plague: The Time and Terrifying Story of the Yellow Fever Epidemic of 1793 (about the Yellow Fever Epidemic of 1793)
| rowspan="4" |Finalist
|-
|
|Breakout
|-
|
|Locomotion
|-
|
|The River Between Us
|-
| rowspan="5" |2004
|
|Godless
|Winner
| rowspan="5" |
|-
|
|Harlem Stomp!: A Cultural History of the Harlem Renaissance (about the Harlem Renaissance)
| rowspan="4" |Finalist
|-
|
|Honey, Baby, Sweetheart
|-
|
|Luna: A Novel
|-
|
|The Legend of Buddy Bush
|-
| rowspan="5" |2005
|
|The Penderwicks: A Summer Tale of Four Sisters, Two Rabbits, and a Very Interesting Boy
|Winner
| rowspan="5" |
|-
|
|Autobiography of My Dead Brother
|
|-
|
|Each Little Bird That Sings
|
|-
|
|Inexcusable
|
|-
|
|Where I Want to Be
|
|-
| rowspan="5" |2006
|
|The Astonishing Life of Octavian Nothing, Traitor to the Nation, Volume I: The Pox Party
|Winner
| rowspan="5" |
|-
|
|American Born Chinese
| rowspan="4" |Finalist
|-
|
|Keturah and Lord Death
|-
|
|Sold
|-
|
|The Rules of Survival
|-
| rowspan="5" |2007
|
|The Absolutely True Diary of a Part-Time Indian
|Winner
| rowspan="5" |
|-
|
|Skin Hunger: A Resurrection of Magic
| rowspan="4" |Finalist
|-
|
|Story of a Girl
|-
|
|The Invention of Hugo Cabret
|-
|
|Touching Snow
|-
| rowspan="5" |2008
|
|What I Saw and How I Lied
|Winner
| rowspan="5" |
|-
|
|Chains
| rowspan="4" |Finalist
|-
|
|The Disreputable History of Frankie Landau-Banks
|-
|
|The Spectacular Now
|-
|
|The Underneath
|-
| rowspan="5" |2009
|
|Claudette Colvin: Twice Toward Justice
|Winner
| rowspan="5" |
|-
|
|Charles and Emma: The Darwins' Leap of Faith
| rowspan="4" |Finalist
|-
|
|Jumped
|-
|
|Lips Touch, Three Times
|-
|
|Stitches
|-
| rowspan="5" |2010
|
|Mockingbird
|Winner
| rowspan="5" |
|-
|
|Dark Water
| rowspan="4" |Finalist
|-
|
|Lockdown
|-
|
|One Crazy Summer
|-
|
|Ship Breaker
|-
| rowspan="5" |2011
|
|Inside Out & Back Again
|Winner
| rowspan="5" |
|-
|
|Chime
| rowspan="4" |Finalist
|-
|
|Flesh and Blood So Cheap: The Triangle Fire and Its Legacy (about the Triangle Shirtwaist Factory fire)
|-
|
|My Name Is Not Easy
|-
|
|Okay for Now
|-
| rowspan="5" |2012
|
|Goblin Secrets
|Winner
|
|-
|
|Bomb: The Race to Build―and Steal―the World's Most Dangerous Weapon
| rowspan="4" |Finalist
| rowspan="4" |
|-
|
|Endangered
|-
|
|Never Fall Down
|-
|
|Out of Reach
|-
| rowspan="5" |2013
|
|The Thing About Luck
|Winner
|
|-
|
|Boxers and Saints
| rowspan="4" |Finalist
| rowspan="4" |
|-
|
|Far Far Away
|-
|
|Picture Me Gone
|-
|
|The True Blue Scouts of Sugar Man Swamp
|-
| rowspan="5" |2014
|
|Brown Girl Dreaming
|Winner
|
|-
|
|Noggin
| rowspan="4" |Finalist
| rowspan="4" |
|-
|
|Revolution
|-
|
|The Port Chicago 50
|-
|
|Threatened
|-
| rowspan="5" |2015
|
|Challenger Deep
|Winner
| rowspan="5" |
|-
|
|Bone Gap
| rowspan="4" |Finalist
|-
|
|Most Dangerous: Daniel Ellsberg and the Secret History of the Vietnam War
|-
|
|Nimona
|-
|
|The Thing About Jellyfish
|-
| rowspan="5" |2016
|, Nate Powell, and Andrew Aydin
|March: Book Three
|Winner
| rowspan="5" |
|-
|
|Ghost
| rowspan="4" |Finalist
|-
|
|Raymie Nightingale
|-
|
|The Sun Is Also a Star
|-
|
|When the Sea Turned to Silver
|-
| rowspan="5" |2017
|
|Far from the Tree
|Winner
| rowspan="5" |
|-
|
|American Street
| rowspan="4" |Finalist
|-
|
|Clayton Byrd Goes Underground
|-
|
|I Am Not Your Perfect Mexican Daughter
|-
|
|What Girls Are Made Of
|-
| rowspan="5" |2018
|
|The Poet X
|Winner
|
|-
|
|Hey, Kiddo
| rowspan="4" |Finalist
| rowspan="4" |
|-
| and Eugene Yelchin
|The Assassination of Brangwain Spurge
|-
|
|The Journey of Little Charlie
|-
|
|The Truth as Told by Mason Buttle
|-
| rowspan="5" |2019
|
|1919 The Year That Changed America
|Winner
| rowspan="5" |
|-
|
|Look Both Ways: A Tale Told in Ten Blocks
| rowspan="4" |Finalist
|-
|
|Patron Saints of Nothing
|-
|
|Pet
|-
|
|Thirteen Doorways, Wolves Behind Them All
|-
| rowspan="5" |2020
|
|King and the Dragonflies
|Winner
|
|-
|
|Every Body Looking
| rowspan="4" |Finalist
| rowspan="4" |
|-
|
|The Way Back
|-
|
|We Are Not Free
|-
| and Omar Mohamed
|When Stars Are Scattered
|-
| rowspan="5" |2021
|
|Last Night at the Telegraph Club
|Winner
| rowspan="5" |
|-
|
|Me (Moth)
| rowspan="4" |Finalist
|-
|
|Revolution in Our Time: The Black Panther Party's Promise to the People
|-
|
|The Legend of Auntie Po
|-
|
|Too Bright to See
|-
| rowspan="5" |2022
|
|All My Rage
|Winner
|
|-
|
|The Ogress and the Orphans
| rowspan="4" |Finalist
| rowspan="5" |
|-
|
|The Lesbiana's Guide to Catholic School
|-
|, Derrick Barnes and Dawud Anyabwile
|Victory. Stand!: Raising My Fist for Justice
|-

|
|Maizy Chen's Last Chance
|}

Authors with two awardsSee Winners of multiple U.S. National Book AwardsTwo authors have won two Children's or Young People's awards twice. 
Lloyd Alexander won for The Marvelous Misadventures of Sebastian (1971) and Westmark (1982), among six titles that were finalists.

Katherine Paterson won for The Master Puppeteer (1977) and The Great Gilly Hopkins (1979), among three titles that were finalists.

Isaac Bashevis Singer won the Children's Literature award in 1970 for A Day of Pleasure: Stories of a Boy Growing up in Warsaw and shared the Fiction award in 1974 for A Crown of Feathers and Other Stories''.

See also
List of winners of the National Book Award — all categories, winners only

Notes

References

American children's literary awards
National Book Award
Awards established in 1969